He Xuemei (born 6 February 1977) is a Chinese gymnast. She competed in six events at the 1992 Summer Olympics.  She was the last female Olympic athlete to perform the Thomas salto in her routine.

In 2006, she married Takaseki Takashi, a logistics manager from Japan, and changed her name to Takaseki Setsubai (高堰雪梅).

She represented Japan at the 2006 Asian Artistic Gymnastics Championships.

References

External links
 

1977 births
Living people
Chinese female artistic gymnasts
Olympic gymnasts of China
Gymnasts at the 1992 Summer Olympics
Place of birth missing (living people)
Asian Games medalists in gymnastics
Gymnasts at the 1994 Asian Games
Asian Games gold medalists for China
Medalists at the 1994 Asian Games
20th-century Chinese women